The Commanding Officer's Quarters, Watertown Arsenal is a historic house in Watertown, Massachusetts.  During the American Civil War, a new commander's quarters was commissioned by then-Capt. Thomas J. Rodman, inventor of the Rodman gun, for the Watertown Arsenal. The lavish, quarters would ultimately become one of the largest commander's quarters on any U.S. military installation. The expense ($63,478.65) was considered wasteful and excessive and drew a stern rebuke from Congress, who then promoted Rodman to Brigadier General and sent him to command Rock Island Arsenal on the frontier in Illinois, where he built an even larger commander's quarters.  The Watertown commander's quarters house now houses offices and a museum about the arsenal.

The building was listed on the National Register of Historic Places in 1976, and included in the Watertown Arsenal Historic District in 1999.

See also
National Register of Historic Places listings in Middlesex County, Massachusetts

References

Houses on the National Register of Historic Places in Middlesex County, Massachusetts
Buildings and structures in Watertown, Massachusetts
Historic district contributing properties in Massachusetts